Gamasellus vibrissatus is a species of mite in the family Ologamasidae.

References

vibrissatus
Articles created by Qbugbot
Animals described in 1967